The 1907 Washington football team was an American football team that represented the University of Washington during the 1907 college football season. In its second season under coach Victor M. Place, the team compiled a 4–4–2 record and outscored its opponents by a combined total of 96 to 48. Enoch Bagshaw was the team captain.

Following this season, Washington did not lose a game for a decade.

Schedule

References

Washington
Washington Huskies football seasons
Washington football